Alistair John Alec Gray (born 8 July 1982, in Johannesburg) is a South African first-class cricketer for the Cape Cobras. He is a right-handed opening batsman as well as a right arm leg spin bowler.  He made his first-class debut in 2004–05 and has made 1849 runs with an average of 35.55.

References
 

1982 births
South African people of British descent
Cape Cobras cricketers
Living people
South African cricketers
Western Province cricketers